Dietrich Brüggemann (born 23 February 1976) is a German film director screenwriter and musician. He collaborates closely with his sister Anna Brüggemann on several screenplays for his films. They were awarded the Silver Bear for Best Screenplay for Stations of the Cross.

Selected filmography
 (2006)
Run If You Can (2010)
Move (2012)
Stations of the Cross (2014)
 (2015)
Tatort: Stau (2017, TV series episode)
Tatort: Murot und das Murmeltier (2019, TV series episode)

References

External links
 

1976 births
Living people
Film people from Munich
German film directors
German screenwriters
German male screenwriters
Musicians from Munich
Silver Bear for Best Screenplay winners